Christian Erwin Urízar Muñoz (born 27 May 1968) is a Chilean politician who served as deputy.

References

External Links
 BCN Profile

1968 births
Living people
Chilean people
Socialist Party of Chile politicians
Pontifical Catholic University of Valparaíso alumni